Opsiphanes cassina, the split-banded owlet, is a species of butterfly belonging to the family Nymphalidae.

Description
The uppersides of their wings are dark brown, with yellow-orange bands crossing the forewings and the edges of the hindwings. The undersides of the wings are also brown, with some large eyespots. Adults of this species are only alive for about ten days, in which they have to feed, mate and lay their eggs.

The larvae are bright green, and posses two prong-like protrusions on their rear. Their diet includes Cocos nucifera, Livistona species, Acrocomia vinifera, Bactris guineensis, Erythrea salvadorensis and Roystonea regia. They are also dangerous defoliators of the oil palm.

Distribution
This species occurs from Mexico to the Amazon basin.

Subspecies
Opsiphanes cassina cassina
Opsiphanes cassina aiellae Bristow
Opsiphanes cassina icassina Felder & Felder, 1862
Opsiphanes cassina fabricii (Boisduval, 1870) (Mexico - Panama, Guatemala, Costa Rica)
Opsiphanes cassina chiriquensis Stichel, 1902 (Panama)
Opsiphanes cassina merianae Stichel, 1902 (Suriname)
Opsiphanes cassina notanda Stichel, 1904 (Peru)
Opsiphanes cassina numatius Fruhstorfer, 1912 (Colombia)
Opsiphanes cassina barkeri Bristow, 1991 (Ecuador)
Opsiphanes cassina caliensis Bristow, 1991 (Colombia)
Opsiphanes cassina milesi Bristow, 1991 (Brazil)

References
 "Opsiphanes Doubleday, [1849]" at Markku Savela's Lepidoptera and Some Other Life Forms
 Learn about Butterflies
 Loría Ronny, Chinchilla Carlos, Dominguez José, Mexzón Ramón An effective trap to capture adults of Opsiphanes cassina

External links 

 Neotropical butterflies
 Opsiphanes cassina, Butterflies of America
 Opsiphanes cassina, Sangay National Park
 Opsiphanes cassina Reiman Gardens

Morphinae
Fauna of Brazil
Nymphalidae of South America
Butterflies described in 1862
Taxa named by Baron Cajetan von Felder
Taxa named by Rudolf Felder